The 1961 Warrington by-election was held on 20 April 1961 when the incumbent Labour MP, Dr Edith Summerskill became a Life Peer.  The seat was retained by the Labour candidate Thomas Williams.

Candidates
The local Liberals selected 39 year old insurance official Frank Tetlow. He was born in September 1921 and educated at King's School, Macclesfield. He was a member of the Liberal Party Council. He had been elected to Cheshire County Council and Bredbury and Romiley Urban District Council. At the 1959 general election he had been Liberal candidate for Knutsford.

Result

References

Warrington 1961
Warrington 1961
Warrington by-election
Warrington by-election
1960s in Lancashire
Warrington by-election